Michael C. Latham (May 6, 1928 – April 1, 2011) was a Tanzanian-born professor emeritus at Cornell University.

Life
Latham was born in Tanzania in 1928. Latham went to Dublin University in Ireland for both his undergraduate (1949) and graduate (1952) studies in medicine. Later, he graduated with a master's degree in tropical medicine from the University of London in 1958 and a master's degree in public health and nutrition from Harvard University in 1965.

Between 1955 and 1964, Latham worked for the Ministry of Health in Tanzania and served as its director of nutrition.

In 1963, Latham began advocating for the use of breastfeeding instead of infant milk formula, and after a decade of struggle, in 1981 he was able to regulate the marketing of infant formula.

To promote breastfeeding, he co-founded the World Alliance for Breastfeeding Action in 1991.

Awards
 Order of the British Empire (1965)
 American Society of Nutritional Sciences Kellogg Prize in International Nutrition
 Gopalan Medal awarded by the Nutrition Society of India

Bibliography
 Kilimanjaro Tales: The Saga of a Medical Family in Africa
 Human Nutrition in Tropical Africa
 Human Nutrition in the Developing World
 Hidden Hunger and the Role of Public-Private Partnership

References

1928 births
2011 deaths
Nutritionists
Tanzanian politicians
Cornell University faculty
Alumni of Trinity College Dublin
Alumni of the London School of Hygiene & Tropical Medicine
Harvard School of Public Health alumni